The nineteenth series of Geordie Shore, a British television programme based in Newcastle Upon Tyne began airing on 9 April 2019. It concluded after ten episodes on 11 June 2019. Ahead of the series it was confirmed that four new cast had joined; Beau Brennan, Tahlia Chung, Bethan Kershaw and Natalie Phillips. They replaced former cast member Faith Mullen who did not return to the show. This series also marks the end for Scott Timlin and Alex MacPherson, and original cast members Sophie Kasaei and Holly Hagan. Chloe Ferry also announced her departure from the show, but later returned for the next series. Despite not being official cast members, Abbie Holborn and Adam Guthrie continued to make appearances throughout the series.

Cast 
Alex MacPherson
Beau Brennan
Tahlia Chung
Chloe Ferry
Holly Hagan
Sam Gowland
Nathan Henry
Sophie Kasaei
Bethan Kershaw
Natalie Phillips
Scott Timlin

Duration of cast

 = Cast member is featured in this episode.
 = Cast member arrives in the house.
 = Cast member voluntarily leaves the house.
 = Cast member leaves the series.
 = Cast member returns to the series.
 = Cast member features in this episode, but is outside of the house.
 = Cast member does not feature in this episode.
 = Cast member is not officially a cast member in this episode.

Episodes

Ratings

References

Series 19
2019 British television seasons